Edward Wynne (born 3 June 1961) is an English guitarist and keyboardist best known as a founding member, principal composer and the only constant member of psychedelic rock band Ozric Tentacles.

Biography
Ed Wynne was born in Wandsworth, London, England, and is the son of English sculptor David Wynne, and the grandson of English author Joan Grant. Family friend and late Beatles guitarist, George Harrison, encouraged a seven year old Wynne to pick up the guitar. Wynne's father regularly had big names in music, such as Jimi Hendrix and Donovan, stay over at the house. The family's emphasis on art and music allowed Wynne to achieve a wide range of musical appreciation, including Gong/Steve Hillage, Hawkwind, Kraan, Frank Zappa, and Todd Rundgren. In addition to Hendrix, Hillage and Zappa, other guitarists who have influenced Wynne include Steve Vai, Joe Satriani, and Guthrie Govan, who Wynne called "my favourite guitarist in the world at the moment" in 2021.

Wynne's lack of interest in school caused him to leave school at age 16. His parents encouraged him to follow his musical passion, and would instruct him to play sounds of nature on the piano. He was involved with several bands whilst in school, including Bolshem People, which recorded in Wynne's studio attic in Rushmere, Wimbledon Common. A track of theirs, "Erp Riff 83", can be heard on the compilation album A Psychedelic Psauna.

Wynne formed Ozric Tentacles in 1983 along with his brother Roly Wynne and other members at the Stonehenge Free Festival. The band was notable for blending rock music with jazz fusion, ambient dub, world music, and electronic music, incorporating heavy usage of synthesizers and samplers. After several line-up changes, Ozric Tentacles started to be guided more and more by Wynne, who aside from guitar and keyboards was also becoming responsible for beat programming and other studio efforts. He has remained the only original member of the band. Since the 2000s, the band featured Wynne's ex-wife Brandi on bass, and son Silas Neptune on keyboards.

Wynne collaborated with Joie Hinton in Nodens Ictus, after being asked by the promoters of the Crypt club in Deptford, South London, to produce an ambient set for the club's "chillout" room. Wynne has also appeared as a guest musician in works by artists such as Jordan Rudess, Amon Düül UK, Eat Static, and Invisible System, among others. In 2007, he (along with ex-bandmate Merv Pepler) composed and programmed a track named "Sphere Wave's" for the Cognition Factor soundtrack.

In 2019, Wynne released his debut solo album, Shimmer into Nature. In 2022, he released his second solo album, Tumbling Through the Floativerse, in collaboration with Gre Vanderloo of Gracerooms.

Wynne's gear includes synthesizers such as Novation Supernova II, Korg M50, Roland S760, Roland Fantom XR, Roland D-50, Korg Wavestation EX, Korg Prophecy, Sequential Pro-1, guitars Ibanez JEM, Ibanez Artist, Ibanez EGEN18, Yamaha Acoustic, pedals Boss GT-3 and Boss GT-10, and Marshall Amplification.

Discography

Solo albums
Shimmer into Nature (2019)
Tumbling Through the Floativerse (2022)

Ozric Tentacles

Nodens Ictus
The Grove of Selves (1987)
Spacelines (2000)
The Cozmic Key (2017)

Guest appearances
 Amon Düül UK – Die Lösung (1989)
 Jordan Rudess – The Road Home (2007)
 Eat Static – Back to Earth (2008)
 Invisible System – Street Clan (2011)
 Quantum Fantay – Dancing in Limbo (2015)
 Keepers Brew - Constellation Automation (2016)
 Silas Neptune - The Scales of Tahuti (2017)

References

External links
Official Ozric Tentacles website

Living people
English rock guitarists
English male guitarists
English record producers
Progressive rock guitarists
Lead guitarists
English rock keyboardists
1961 births
English multi-instrumentalists
English composers
English audio engineers
Musicians from London